WESS is a student operated, non-commercial, FCC-licensed college radio station located on the campus of East Stroudsburg University in East Stroudsburg, Pennsylvania. The station has a diversified music format, which gives listeners and deejays more variety and freedom. The station also offer talk shows, where listeners can call in and voice their opinion on topics being discussed on the show.

WESS also broadcasts the ESU Warrior's home football, basketball, and Baseball games all year long with play by play from our Sports Director and his or her sports crew.

Students at ESU can listen in by tuning their radio dials to FM frequency 90.3, as well as tuning to Channel 14  or 15 on Cable TV in the dorms, or by listening online.

Although the station is on-campus, its 1,000 watt signal spreads out over a 15-30 mile radius in the Poconos and parts of northwestern New Jersey.

The purpose of WESS is to provide a means of student training and experience in radio broadcasting, and to provide East Stroudsburg University and the surrounding communities with alternative entertainment and educational programming.

WESS won the MTV Woodie Award in 2014 for Best College Radio Station.

References

External links

ESS
ESS
Radio stations established in 1945
1945 establishments in Pennsylvania